Burton Island Glacier is a channel glacier, about  wide and  long, flowing north from the continental ice to Posadowsky Bay just west of Cape Torson. It was mapped from aerial photographs taken by U.S. Navy Operation Highjump, 1946–47, and named by the Advisory Committee on Antarctic Names for the USS Burton Island, one of the two icebreakers of U.S. Navy Operation Windmill, 1947–48, which assisted in establishing astronomical control stations along Wilhelm II Coast, Queen Mary Coast, Knox Coast and Budd Coast.

See also
 List of glaciers in the Antarctic
 Glaciology

References 

Glaciers of Kaiser Wilhelm II Land